The 1938–39 Scottish Cup was the 61st staging of Scotland's most prestigious football knockout competition. The Cup was won by Clyde who defeated Motherwell in the final.

First round

Replays

Second round

Replays

Third round

Replays

Quarter-finals

Semi-finals

Replays

Final

Teams

See also
1938–39 in Scottish football

References

External links
 Video highlights from official Pathé News archive

Scottish Cup seasons
Scot
Cup